The 2021–22 Georgia Tech Yellow Jackets women's basketball team represented the Georgia Institute of Technology during the 2021–22 NCAA Division I women's basketball season. They were led by third-year head coach Nell Fortner and played their home games at McCamish Pavilion as members of the Atlantic Coast Conference.

The Yellow Jackets finished the season 21–11 overall and 11–7 in ACC play to finish in sixth place.  As the sixth seed in the ACC tournament, they defeated Wake Forest in the Second Round before losing to Notre Dame in the Quarterfinals.  They received an at-large bid to the NCAA tournament where they were the ninth seed in the Spokane Regional.  They lost their First Round match-up against Kansas to end their season.

Previous season

The Yellow Jackets finished the season 17–9 and 12–6 in ACC play to finish in third place. In the ACC tournament, they defeated to Clemson in the Quarterfinals before losing to eventual champions NC State in the Semifinals.  They received an at-large bid to the NCAA tournament where they were the five seed in the HemisFair Regional.  In the tournament they defeated twelve seed  in the First Round and four seed West Virginia before losing to one seed South Carolina in the Sweet Sixteen to end their season.

Off-season

Departures

Incoming Transfers

Recruiting Class

Source:

Roster

Schedule
Source:

|-
!colspan=6 style=""| Exhibition

|-
!colspan=6 style=""| Regular Season

|-
!colspan=6 style=""| ACC Women's Tournament

|-
!colspan=6 style=";"| NCAA tournament

Rankings

See also
2021–22 Georgia Tech Yellow Jackets men's basketball team

References

Georgia Tech Yellow Jackets women's basketball seasons
Georgia Tech
Georgia Tech
2021 in sports in Georgia (U.S. state)
2022 in sports in Georgia (U.S. state)